Phrixotrichus scrofa is a tarantula spider, commonly known as the Chilean copper, Chilean pink burst or Chilean violet tarantula. It was first described by Juan Ignacio Molina in 1782. Its synonyms include Phrixotrichus auratus, Paraphysa scrofa, and possibly Phrixotrichus chilensis. It is native to Chile and Argentina, inhabiting mainly arid forests, and is kept as a pet somewhat commonly.

Description 
In captivity, females live 25 years, while males can only live 4 to 5 years, under proper care, and getting to be roughly 10 cm in size. Males are usually more colorful and vibrant. They have grey legs, reaching all the way to their trochanters, which are a copper red color. Its carapace is the same copper red color as the trochanter, with the opisthosoma being a copper red color nearest to the carapace, transitioning to a grey further away.

Distribution and habitat 
Phrixotrichus scrofa is native to Chile and Argentina. In Chile, they are known from some locations in the Biobío region, more specifically in Colcura and Valle de Nonguén. The average yearly temperatures in Valle de Nonguén are 14 °C, with an average rainfall of 735 mm, with some of the local vegetation being raulí, tineo and huillipatagu.

Behavior 
They are terrestrial tarantulas, being very active and docile, although not often, if they have enough anchor points, they may even produce a web. While owning urticating hairs, they rarely use them.

References 

Spiders of South America
Spiders described in 1782
Theraphosidae